The Pleased was an American pop rock and indie rock band formed in San Francisco, California in 2002 and active in California until their disbandment in 2006.

Description
The band featured prominent "freak folk" musicians and producers Joanna Newsom and Noah Georgeson. The band self-released two EPs in 2002, the debut EP Never Complete and One Piece from the Middle, and in 2003 released their debut album, Don't Make Things, through Los Angeles-based independent record label Big Wheel Recreation.

Members
The band consisted of members Noah Georgeson (as lead vocalist and guitarist), Rich Good (as vocalist and guitarist), Genaro Vergoglini (as drummer), Luckey Remington (as bassist), and Joanna Newsom and Jason Clark (as keyboardists).

References

The Pleased (Official Website)
The Pleased on Discogs

www.luckeyremington.com

2002 establishments in California
Indie rock musical groups from California
Musical groups from San Francisco
Musical groups established in 2002
Musical groups disestablished in 2006